Sakoda (written: 迫田) is a Japanese surname. Notable people with the surname include:

Louie Sakoda (born 1986), American football player
Ryan Sakoda (born 1974), Japanese-American professional wrestler
, Japanese volleyball player

Japanese-language surnames